The Samsung SGH-D600 (and its successor, the D600i) is a GSM mobile phone released in the first quarter of 2005 made by Samsung Electronics.

The SGH-D600i is a later version of the SGH-D600, released in 2007 to address issues concerning microSD card support.

Features and specifications

The Samsung SGH-D600 is the successor to the Samsung SGH-D500, and differs from it with a slightly revised design, a higher resolution 2-megapixel camera located outside the sliding area instead of inside, TV output, and support for microSD external flash memory cards. It also includes a Picsel Viewer for Microsoft Office documents. It is available in two colors, grey and red. The SGH-D600 also includes a camera with a resolution of 1600x1200 pixels, Bluetooth connectivity, and a  240x320 pixel screen.

The battery claims to have a stand-by time of up to 300 hours and a talk time of up to 7 hours.

Reception and criticism
The Register praised its looks and small size.  Trusted Reviews awarded it 9/10, calling it "a great looking phone with a screen that puts other handsets to shame". CNet gave a positive review scoring 3.5/5 suggesting it was "good both for professionals and those looking for fun features".

The phone's poor visual TV out quality has received criticism.

References

External links
 Datasheet

D600
Slider phones